Danielle, Asperger is a chick-lit novel book released in 2016 by Brazilian writer Sophia Mendonça. This was the second book published by the author and the first fictional, after the memoir Outro Olhar (2015).

Book's Overview 
Danielle, Asperger chronicles the misadventures of an autistic teenager. In this way, it addresses topics such as eating disorders in youth, the world of celebrities and autism in women. The book presents an ironic and humorous perspective on a specific aspect of youth, inspired by the literature of Sophie Kinsella and Meg Cabot. Thus, it brings considerations about the search for balance between self-acceptance and self-criticism, in addition to addressing social camouflage in autism.

Sophia Mendonça reports having written Danielle, Asperger's during a sleepless night, in the midst of a depressive episode, at the age of 14. As the author said in an interview at the time of release, she was in her early teens during the creative process. So, for her, the universal anxieties of the moment were added to the anxieties of those who are finding themselves different, for being autistic. The author claimed to have the desire to write a light and fun book like the ones she read in her teens, despite the dramatic subjects.

Reception 
Danielle, Asperger received widespread acclaim from the public, which was surprising in the context of the release, given expectations that it would be difficult to land a book on autism with a fictional narrative.

Literary critic Bruna Rezende highlighted the agile plot and the captivating protagonist, defining the work as "highly recommended" for lovers of fast and fun stories.

References 

Brazilian novels
2016 books
2010s books
Books about autistic women
Chick lit novels
Young adult books
Books about autism
Books by Sophia Mendonça